Global Medical Excellence Cluster (GMEC) describes the business cluster model formed by premier UK academic institutions with medical centres in biomedical and related technologies and patient care with a view of forging resources and strengths towards medical innovation and healthcare improvement research. Currently, GMEC represents the largest life science bio-cluster in the world.

GMEC was founded by five universities, namely: University of Cambridge, University College London, Imperial College London, King's College London and University of Oxford. It was then joined by Queen Mary University of London in 2012.

GMEC is the UK's answer to the biomedical clusters that is trending in the USA, Europe and Asia, where academia and industry collaborate to deliver medical innovation and generate economic value.

Gallery

See also
 Golden triangle (universities)
 MedCity (London)
 University of Cambridge
 University College London
 Imperial College London
 King's College London
 University of Oxford

References

External links
GMEC website

British medical research
College and university associations and consortia in the United Kingdom
Innovation in the United Kingdom